The R495 is a regional road in Ireland. Running entirely within County Tipperary, it starts in Nenagh at Richmond Cross, a junction with the R494, and ends at Dromineer on the shores of Lough Derg.

See also
 Roads in Ireland - (Primary National Roads)
 Secondary Roads
 Regional Roads

References

Regional roads in the Republic of Ireland
Roads in County Tipperary